The 2011 Antonio Savoldi–Marco Cò – Trofeo Dimmidisì was a professional tennis tournament played on clay courts. It was the thirteenth edition of the tournament which is part of the 2011 ATP Challenger Tour. It took place in Manerbio, Italy between 22 and 28 August 2011.

ATP entrants

Seeds

 1 Rankings are as of August 15, 2011.

Other entrants
The following players received wildcards into the singles main draw:
  Federico Delbonis
  Evgeny Korolev
  Thomas Muster
  Matteo Trevisan

The following players received entry as a special exempt into the singles main draw:
  Nicolás Pastor

The following players received entry from the qualifying draw:
  Peter Gojowczyk
  Michael Lammer
  Boris Pašanski
  Walter Trusendi

Champions

Singles

 Adrian Ungur def.  Peter Gojowczyk, 4–6, 7–6(7–4), 6–2

Doubles

 Dustin Brown /  Lovro Zovko def.  Alessio di Mauro /  Alessandro Motti, 7–6(7–4), 7–5

External links
Official Website
ITF Search
ATP official site

Antonio Savoldi-Marco Co - Trofeo Dimmidisi
Antonio Savoldi–Marco Cò – Trofeo Dimmidisì
2011 in Italian tennis